Most internal transport in Solomon Islands is conducted through boat travel between islands. Road transport infrastructure is rudimentary, with few paved roads.

Statistics 

Railways:
0 km

Highways:
total:
1,360 km
paved:
33 km
unpaved:
1,327 km (includes about 800 km of private plantation roads) (2002)

Ports and harbors:
Aola Bay, Honiara, Lofung, Noro, Viru Harbor, Yandina

Merchant marine:
none (1999 est.)

Airports:
36 (2012)

Airports - with paved runways:
total:
1
1,524 to 2,437 m:
1 (Honiara International Airport) (2012)

Airports - with unpaved runways:
total:
35
1,524 to 2,437 m:
1
914 to 1,523 m:
9
under 914 m:
25 (2012)

Heliports
total: 3 (2012)

References 

Transport in the Solomon Islands

External links